The 1992 1. divisjon, Norway's second-tier football league, began play on 26 April 1992 and ended on 4 October 1992. The league was contested by 24 teams, divided in two groups and the winner of each group won promotion to Tippeligaen, while the runners-up played a promotion-playoff against the 10th placed team in the 1992 Tippeligaen. The bottom three teams were relegated to the 2. divisjon.

Bodø/Glimt and Fyllingen won promotion to Tippeligaen, while Odd, Pors, Fredrikstad, Os, Stjørdals-Blink and Haugar was relegated to the 2. divisjon.

League tables

Group A

Group B

See also
 1992 Tippeligaen
 1992 2. divisjon
 1992 3. divisjon

References

Norwegian First Division seasons
2
Norway
Norway